Ernst Pulgram (September 18, 1915 – August 17, 2005) was an American linguist of Austrian origins whose main interest lay in the Italic and Romance languages. He is survived by his wife, linguist Frances McSparran.

Born and educated in Vienna, he was forced to leave shortly after the Anschluss to escape from the Nazis. He moved to the United States and joined the US army to fight in World War II. Because he had left Vienna a few days before his PhD defence and thus was not able to complete the degree, shortly after the war Pulgram started a new PhD at Harvard University under the G.I. Bill. After graduation, he spent most of his career (1948–1986) at the University of Michigan. Throughout his life, he maintained ties to his Austrian homeland, which included in later years several Viennese linguists (such as historical English linguist Herbert Schendl).

One obituary read that Pulgram's death meant that "the last of the great Romanists who had to flee from the Nazis and went to the States, is gone." Pulgram held Visiting Professorships at universities in Florence, Cologne, Heidelberg, Regensburg, Vienna, Innsbruck, Munich, and Tokyo.

Bibliography 
 The Tongues of Italy, Prehistory and History
 Latin-romance phonology: Prosodics and metrics (Ars grammatica)
 Applied Linguistics in Language Teaching
 Italic, Latin, Italian: 600 B.C. to A.D. 1260 : texts and commentaries; (Indogermanische Bibliothek. Reihe 1, Lehr und Handbücher)
 Practicing linguist: Essays on language and languages, 1950-1985

References

Linguists from the United States
Linguists from Austria
Romance philologists
University of Michigan faculty
Austrian emigrants to the United States
Scientists from Vienna
1915 births
2005 deaths
Harvard University alumni
20th-century linguists